Camp County is a county in the eastern part of Texas. As of the 2020 census, its population was 12,464. Its seat is Pittsburg. The county was founded in 1874 and is named for John Lafayette Camp, a Texas politician.

Geography
It is the third smallest county by area in Texas.

Major highways
  U.S. Highway 271
  State Highway 11

Adjacent counties
 Titus County (north)
 Morris County (east)
 Upshur County (south)
 Wood County (southwest)
 Franklin County (west)

Communities

City
 Pittsburg (county seat)

Town
 Rocky Mound

Unincorporated communities
 Ebenezer
 Leesburg
 Newsome

Ghost town
 Center Point

Demographics

Note: the US Census treats Hispanic/Latino as an ethnic category. This table excludes Latinos from the racial categories and assigns them to a separate category. Hispanics/Latinos can be of any race.

According to the census of 2000, 11,549 people, 4,336 households, and 3,156 families were living in the county. The population density was 58 people per square mile (23/km2). The 5,228 housing units had an average density of 26 per square mile (10/km2). The racial makeup of the county was 69.53% White, 19.20% African American, 0.35% Native American, 0.17% Asian, 9.68% from other races, and 1.07% from two or more races; 14.78% of the population were Hispanics or Latinos of any race.

Up from 2000's population of 11,549 people, and 2010's 12,401 residents, Camp County grew to 12,464 at the 2020 U.S. census. Among the 2020 population, its racial and ethnic makeup was 54.03% non-Hispanic White, 15.06% Black or African American, 0.22% Native American, 0.84% Asian, 0.06% Pacific Islander, 0.27% some other race, 3.66% multiracial, and 25.85% Hispanic or Latino of any race. Like the majority of the United States at the time, these represented the demographic trends as the U.S. experienced great diversification.

Politics
Camp County is represented in the Texas Senate by Republican Bryan Hughes, a lawyer in Mineola.

See also

 National Register of Historic Places listings in Camp County, Texas
 Recorded Texas Historic Landmarks in Camp County

References

External links

 Camp County government's website
 Camp County in Handbook of Texas Online at the University of Texas
 Historic Camp County materials, hosted by the Portal to Texas History.

 
1874 establishments in Texas
Populated places established in 1874